This is part of a list of Statutes of New Zealand for the period of the Second National Government of New Zealand up to and including part of the first year of the Second Labour Government of New Zealand.

1950s

1958  

 Bluff Water Supply Act 
 Companies Special Investigations Act  Amended: 1959/63/80
 Gas Industry Act  Amended: 1960/61/65/70/79/81
 Geneva Conventions Act  Amended: 1987/2005
 Hastings Gas Company Act 
 Kaikohe Borough Empowering Act 
 Kawerau Borough Act 
 Mackelvie Trust Act 
 Marlborough Harbour Act  Amended: 1959/60/62/77
 Motor-Vehicle Dealers Act  Amended: 1959/64/66/67
 National Service Registration Act 
 Police Act  Amended: 1961/64/65/68/69/72/73/76/78/79/80/81/83/85/87/88/89/91/92/94/95/96/98/2000/03
 Putaruru Borough Empowering Act 
 Simultaneous Deaths Act 
 South Canterbury Electric Power Board Validation Act 
 Southland Harbour Board Act 
 Technicians Certification Act  Amended: 1962/65/66/72
 Thomson Adoption Discharge Act 
 Trade Practices Act  Amended: 1961/64/65/71
 Warkworth Town Council Empowering Act 
Plus 85 Acts amended

1959  

 Agricultural Chemicals Act  Amended: 1963/67/68/70
 Bauxite Act  Amended: 1960/64
 Blenheim Borough Special Rates Consolidation Act 
 Construction Act  Amended: 1966/67/68/69/70/71/72/73/75/76/77/78/81/83/87/89
 Electric Linemen Act  Amended: 1966/70/75/85
 Hydatids Act  Amended: 1960/61/63/65/71/72/73/75/80
 New Plymouth City Special Rates Consolidation Act 
 Otago Central Electric Power Board Empowering Act 
 Plunket Society Rules Act 
 Public Bodies Contracts Act  Amended: 1965/74/75/76
 Taumarunui Borough Special Rates Consolidation Act 
 Tawa Borough Special Rates Consolidation Act 
 Timaru Harbour Board Loan and Empowering Act 
 Volunteers Employment Protection Act  Amended: 1985/87/90/2004/07
Plus 89 Acts amended

1960s

1960  
 Antarctica Act  Amended: 1970
 Auckland Regional Authority Establishment Act 
 Cheques Act 
 Chiropractors Act  Amended: 1961/66/70/94/99
 Cooperative Freezing Companies Act 
 Disabled Persons Employment Promotion Act  Amended: 1985 Repealed: 2007
 Government Service Equal Pay Act 
 Manapouri - Te Anau Development Act  Amended: 1961
 Municipal Insurance Act  Amended: 1965/66/67/68/70/72/73/75/81
 Nelson Railway Authorisation Act 
 Republic of Ghana Act 
 Southland Harbour Board Empowering Act 
 Tamaki River Reclamation Act 
 Te Kauwhata Town Council Empowering Act 
 Trustee Companies Act  Amended: 1968/72/74/75/79/83/90/2002
 Unit Trusts Act  Amended: 1972/74/87/96/98/2001/04
 University Grants Committee Act 
 University of Hawke's Bay Trust Act 
 Waitangi Day Act  Amended: 1963
 Wanganui Orphanage Trust Extension Act 
Plus 95 Acts amended

See also 
The above list may not be current and will contain errors and omissions. For more accurate information try:
 Walter Monro Wilson, The Practical Statutes of New Zealand, Auckland: Wayte and Batger 1867
 The Knowledge Basket: Legislation NZ
 New Zealand Legislation Includes some Imperial and Provincial Acts. Only includes Acts currently in force, and as amended.
 Legislation Direct List of statutes from 2003 to order

Lists of statutes of New Zealand